The Riverton School District is a community public school district that serves students in kindergarten through eighth grade from Riverton in Burlington County, New Jersey, United States.

As of the 2020–21 school year, the district, comprised of one school, had an enrollment of 294 students and 27.7 classroom teachers (on an FTE basis), for a student–teacher ratio of 10.6:1.

The district is classified by the New Jersey Department of Education as being in District Factor Group "GH", the third-highest of eight groupings. District Factor Groups organize districts statewide to allow comparison by common socioeconomic characteristics of the local districts. From lowest socioeconomic status to highest, the categories are A, B, CD, DE, FG, GH, I and J.

For ninth through twelfth grades, students in public school attend Palmyra High School in Palmyra, together with students from Beverly, as part of a sending/receiving relationship with the Palmyra Public Schools. In the early 1990s, the district had considered options to ends its sending relationship with Palmyra. As of the 2020–21 school year, the high school had an enrollment of 378 students and 31.0 classroom teachers (on an FTE basis), for a student–teacher ratio of 12.2:1.

School
Riverton Elementary School served 296 students in grades PreK-8 as of the 2020–21 school year.

Administration
Core members of the district's administration are:
Joshua Zagorski, Superintendent / Principal
Nikolas Vrettos, Business Administrator / Board Secretary

Board of education
The district's board of education is comprised of nine members who set policy and oversee the fiscal and educational operation of the district through its administration. As a Type II school district, the board's trustees are elected directly by voters to serve three-year terms of office on a staggered basis, with three seats up for election each year held (since 2012) as part of the November general election. The board appoints a superintendent to oversee the district's day-to-day operations and a business administrator to supervise the business functions of the district.

References

External links 
Riverton School District
 
School Data for the Riverton School District, National Center for Education Statistics

Riverton, New Jersey
New Jersey District Factor Group GH
School districts in Burlington County, New Jersey
Public K–8 schools in New Jersey